The 2022–23 FA Trophy (known for sponsorship reasons as the Isuzu FA Trophy) is the 54th season of the FA Trophy, an annual football competition for teams at levels 5–8 of the English football league system.

Eligibility 
Applications to enter the 54th edition of the FA Trophy opened on 25 February 2022 and closed 1 April 2022.

Competition is open to the 320 clubs playing in Steps 1–4 of the National League System, equivalent to tiers 5–8 of the overall English football league system. All but Guernsey F.C. (8) appeared on the list of clubs accepted on 1 July 2022. This resulted in an odd number of teams remaining in the first round qualifying, so a bye was allocated to Leek Town.

Format 
The calendar was announced by The Football Association on 1 July 2022. The competition consists of three qualifying rounds and eight proper rounds. Teams enter at different stages depending on their position in the English pyramid. 8th tier teams enter into the first qualifying round and must win 11 matches to become champions. 7th tier teams enter into the third qualifying round and must win 9 matches to become champions. 6th tier teams enter into the second round proper and must win 7 matches to become champions. 5th tier teams enter into the third round proper and must win 6 matches to become champions. 

All rounds are single-match knockout format, with the winner decided by penalties if the match was drawn after 90 minutes, apart from the Final where the winner was decided by extra-time and penalties if the match is drawn. This is the same format as the 2020–21 and 2021–22 season which broke from previous seasons that used replays and two-legged semi-finals.

First Round Qualifying 
The draw for the first qualifying round was made on 8 July 2022. 

159 teams, all from Level 8 of the English football league system, were drawn into 79 fixtures, with the leftover team, Leek Town, receiving a bye. Ties were originally scheduled for 9–11 September, but were postponed to 12–14 September as a mark of respect following the death of Queen Elizabeth II.

Second Round Qualifying 
The draw for the second qualifying round was made on 8 July 2022, and saw the 79 winners from the first qualifying round joined by Leek Town who had received a bye. All teams were from Level 8 of the English football league system.

Third Round Qualifying 
The draw for the third qualifying round was made on 26 September 2022, and saw 88 clubs from tier 7 joining the 40 winners from the second qualifying round.

First round proper 

The draw for the first round was made on 10 October containing the 64 winners from the previous round.

Second round proper 
The draw for the second round was made on 31 October 2022, with eighty teams making an appearance including 32 winners from the previous round and 48 teams newly entering from Level 6.

Third round proper 

64 teams made an appearance including 40 winners from the previous round and 24 newly entering teams from Level 5.

Fourth round proper 
The draw was made on 19 December 2022 containing the 32 winners from the previous round. There were six remaining teams from the seventh tier, the lowest-ranked teams left in the competition.

Fifth round proper 

The draw was made on 16 January 2023, containing the 16 winners from the previous round. Bracknell Town of the seventh tier are the lowest-ranked team left in the competition.

Quarter-finals 
The draw for the quarter-finals was made on 13 February 2023. Eight winners from the previous round made an appearance. Farsley Celtic of the sixth tier was the lowest-ranked club remaining.

Semi-finals 

The draw for the semi-finals was made on 13 March 2023. Four winners from the previous round made an appearance.

Final

Notes

References 

FA Trophy seasons
FA Trophy